Michelle Russell (born June 27, 1992) is a Canadian sprint kayaker.

Career
Her home club is the Cheema Aquatic Club in Fall River, Nova Scotia, Canada. As a 17-year-old at the 2009 Canada Games Russell represented Nova Scotia where she won two gold medals in K-4 and K-2, as well as two Silver medals in K-1 1000 and K-1 2000 m.  That very same year, Russell was picked as the female K-1, to represent Canada at the 2009 Junior Worlds in Moscow Russia, where she finished 8th and 10th in the K-1 500 and K-1 1000. 2012 was her first World Cup tour where she took home a bronze in K1 200 relay. In 2013, she made four World Cup finals in K1 events and placed fourteenth in K1 200 at Senior Worlds. At the 2013 Under-23 World Championships in Welland she paddled to victory for Canada and claimed the gold medal in the K-1 200m, as well as receiving a bronze medal in the K-1 500. She has also won numerous medals at the national level. 
In 2014, she once again made the Canadian Senior Worlds team that competed in two World Cup events, as well as the senior World Championships in Moscow, Russia. At World Cup event in Racice, she placed 8th in K-1 5000 and 12th in K-1 200. At the World Cup in Szeged, she placed 15th in the K-1 5000, 15th in the K-1 200. At the World Championship, she raced the K-1 200 relay event where she and her team placed 7th, as well as racing the K-1 200 event where she placed 13th and the K-2 500 event where she also placed 13th. She is currently on the World Top Athlete list for Canoe Kayak as of 2013, which meant she has one of the best times ever recorded by a female kayaker at a world level (Wellen, 2013). Her time 39,980 seconds, is the 8th fastest at the 200m distance ever recorded by a female kayaker. As of 2014, she is still on the list but is ranked at 9th. She is currently a member of the Canoe Kayak Canada Senior National team.

In March 2021, Russell was named to Canada's 2020 Olympic team.

Results
2013 U23 World Championships (Welland, Canada) K1 200 – Gold
2013 U23 World Championships (Welland, Canada) K1 500 – Bronze
2013 World Championships (Duisburg, Germany) K1 200 – 14th 
2013 World Cup 3 (Poznan, Poland) K1 200 – 6th
2013 World Cup 3 (Poznan, Poland) K1 500 – 7th
2013 World Cup 3 (Racice, Czech Republic) K1 200 – 9th
2013 World Cup 3 (Racice, Czech Republic) K1 500 – 9th
2009 Junior World Championships (Moscow, Russia) K4 500 – 8th
2009 Junior World Championships (Moscow, Russia) K1 1000 – 10th

References

External links
 CanoeKayak Canada profile of Michelle Russell

1992 births
Canadian female canoeists
Living people
Sportspeople from Dartmouth, Nova Scotia
Pan American Games gold medalists for Canada
Pan American Games silver medalists for Canada
Pan American Games medalists in canoeing
Canoeists at the 2015 Pan American Games
Medalists at the 2015 Pan American Games
Canoeists at the 2020 Summer Olympics
Olympic canoeists of Canada